The 2001–02 Princeton Tigers men's basketball team represented the Princeton University in intercollegiate college basketball during the 2001–02 NCAA Division I men's basketball season. The head coach was John Thompson III and the team co-captains were Michael S. Bechtold and Ahmed El-Nokali. The team played its home games in the Jadwin Gymnasium on the University campus in Princeton, New Jersey, and was co-champion of the Ivy League.  The team earned an invitation to the 40-team 2000 National Invitation Tournament.  The team was making its seventh consecutive postseason appearance.

Using the Princeton offense, the team posted a 16–12 overall record and an 11–4 conference record. The team was led by All-Ivy League second team selections Bechtold and El-Nokali. The Tigers had a chance to win the Ivy League championship outright by defeating  in the regular season finale on March 5, but they lost 64–48, resulting in a three-way tie. By virtue of its superior record head-to-head Penn had a bye in the first round of the three-way playoff. The Tigers played  in a one-game playoff with the winner to face Penn in a one-game championship. Princeton lost 76–60 on March 7 at  The Palestra in Philadelphia, Pennsylvania. In the National Invitation Tournament the team lost its first round contest against the Louisville Cardinals at Freedom Hall in Louisville, Kentucky on March 12 by a 66–65 score. The team lost on a jump shot with 5.3 seconds remaining.

References

Princeton Tigers men's basketball seasons
Princeton Tigers
Princeton
Princeton Tigers men's basketball
Princeton Tigers men's basketball